Lennert Hallaert (born 17 April 2003) is a Belgian professional footballer who plays as a forward for Belgian First Division A side Zulte Waregem.

Club career
On 31 January 2021, Sabbe made his debut for Brugge's reserve side, Club NXT in the Belgian First Division B against Seraing.

In the summer of 2021, Hallaert signed with Zulte Waregem, where he was originally assigned to the Under-21 squad. Next summer, he signed his first professional contract with the club. On 5 August 2022, he made his Belgian First Division A debut for Zulte Waregem against Club Brugge.

Career statistics

Club

References

External links

2003 births
Living people
Belgian footballers
Association football forwards
Club Brugge KV players
S.V. Zulte Waregem players
Challenger Pro League players
Belgian Pro League players
Belgium youth international footballers